USCGC Hamilton (WMSL-753) is the fourth , also known as the National Security Cutter (NSC), of the United States Coast Guard. She is the fifth cutter named after Founding Father Alexander Hamilton, who was the first United States Secretary of the Treasury and in that position requested the formation of the United States Coast Guard (as the United States Revenue Cutter Service). The cutter's sponsor is Linda Kapral Papp, the wife of Coast Guard Commandant Robert J. Papp, Jr.

Construction began in September 2011 by Northrop Grumman's Ship System Ingalls Shipyard in Pascagoula, Mississippi, with the keel was laid on 5 September 2012. Hamilton was launched on 10 August 2013, and her christening was on 26 October 2013. She was delivered to the Coast Guard in September 2014. The cutter is homeported at Joint Base Charleston in North Charleston, South Carolina.

After operating with the Carrier Strike Group, the cutter patrolled the Eastern Pacific Ocean in support of Joint Interagency Task Force (JIATF) South. The cutter returned in April after the 80-day patrol, during which she captured three drug smuggling vessels, including two narco-subs, and eight suspected drug smugglers. After the patrol she offloaded $324 million worth of cocaine and marijuana.

Notable interdictions 

 15 December 2016 - Cutter USCGC Hamilton offloaded 26.5 tons of cocaine estimated at a worth of US$715 million after conducting interdiction operations beside the Royal Canadian Navy since 1 October that same year.
 27 August 2020 - USCGC Hamilton offloaded 11,500 pounds of cocaine and 17,000 pounds of marijuana estimated at an estimated worth of $228 million after a patrol in the Eastern Pacific Ocean alongside  and US Navy patrol boat .
 24 November 2021- USCGC Hamilton offloaded 26,250 pounds of cocaine and 3,700 estimated at a worth of US$504 million. During the deployment it also intercepted 199 Haitian migrants.

Black Sea patrol 
 
In May 2021 Hamilton patrolled the Black Sea for nearly three weeks, conducting training exercises with several  NATO and friendly navies, including Turkey, Romania, Ukraine, and Georgia.  This was the first visit to the Black Sea by a Coast Guard cutter since USCGC Dallas (WHEC-716) in 2008.  The patrol was monitored by Russia whose foreign ministry issued a statement condemning the cutter's presence.

See also
 
 
 
 
 
 Integrated Deepwater System Program

References

Legend-class cutters
2013 ships
Ships built in Pascagoula, Mississippi
Ships named for Founding Fathers of the United States